Henk van Kessel (born 25 June 1946, Mill) is a Dutch former Grand Prix motorcycle road racer. He won the 1974 F.I.M. 50 cc world championship. He won seven Grand Prix races during his lengthy career.

References

External links 
50cc racing page 

1946 births
Living people
Dutch motorcycle racers
50cc World Championship riders
125cc World Championship riders
250cc World Championship riders
80cc World Championship riders
People from Mill en Sint Hubert
Sportspeople from North Brabant
20th-century Dutch people